Girma Wolde-Hana (born 26 July 1952) is an Ethiopian middle-distance runner. He competed in the men's 3000 metres steeplechase at the 1980 Summer Olympics.

References

1952 births
Living people
Athletes (track and field) at the 1980 Summer Olympics
Ethiopian male middle-distance runners
Ethiopian male steeplechase runners
Olympic athletes of Ethiopia
Place of birth missing (living people)